Société Le Chant du Monde v. Société Fox Europe and Société Fox Americaine Twentieth Century (Cour d'appel, Paris, 13 January 1953) is a French case had the same facts as the New York case Shostakovich v. Twentieth Century-Fox, wherein four Russian composers, including Dmitri Shostakovich, sued Fox to prevent the use of their public domain compositions in an anti-Communist film The Iron Curtain. The New York court presciently summed up the future holding of the French court, where it predicted that droit moral could "prevent the use of a composition or work, in the public domain." The film was ordered seized.

Russian music for many decades was in the public domain in the United States and western Europe, as a form of payback for the Soviet Union not recognizing western copyrights.

Normally authors will be long dead before their works come into the public domain, however depending on the country there is authority that authors may dedicate their works to the public domain voluntarily. The Shostakovich and Le Chant du Monde problem, therefore is still with us. The problem is that voluntarily dedicated works may not truly be freely available for modification or even aggregation (the music in Le Chant du Monde was merely a motion picture soundtrack) until the author is dead, even though the works quite clearly are in the public domain.

This case was discussed in Strauss, The Moral Right of the Author, 4 Am. J. Comp. L. 506, 534-35 n.56 (1955).

References

Further reading 
 
 

Public domain
Copyright case law
20th Century Fox litigation
French case law
French copyright law